HD 82943 b is an extrasolar planet approximately 89 light-years away in the constellation of Hydra.  The planet was announced in 2000 by the Geneva Extrasolar Planet Search Team.  The planet is the outermost planet of two.

See also 
 HD 82943 c

References

External links 
 
 

Hydra (constellation)
Exoplanets discovered in 2000
Giant planets
Exoplanets detected by radial velocity
Giant planets in the habitable zone